Boreidae, commonly called snow scorpionflies, or in the British Isles, snow fleas (no relation to the snow flea Hypogastrura nivicola) are a very small family of scorpionflies, containing only around 30 species, all of which are boreal or high-altitude species in the Northern Hemisphere.

These insects are small (typically 6 mm or less), with the wings reduced to bristles or absent, and they are somewhat compressed, so in fact some resemblance to fleas is noted. They are most commonly active during the winter months, towards the transition into spring, and the larvae and adults typically feed on mosses. The adults will often disperse between breeding areas by walking across the open snow, thus the common name. The males use their bristle-like wings to help grasp the female over their back while mating, while the wings of females are vestigial small oval pads with no ability to allow them to fly.  The adults have a long rostrum formed from the clypeus and labrum, genae, and maxillo-labium.

The body temperature, and therefore activity level, of this scorpionfly depends on its absorption of short-wave and long-wave radiation rather than surrounding air temperatures (by which it is completely unaffected).  The boundary layer of snow that the insect occupies has very low thermal conductance, and so the insect loses its own heat very slowly here.  This delicate balance between cold and heat means that the animal is easily killed by heat when held in a human hand.

The group has been proposed in some studies to be the closest relatives of fleas (Siphonaptera), rendering Mecoptera paraphyletic. This has been disputed by other studies, which find Nannochoristidae more closely related to fleas instead.

Phylogeny 

It is unclear as of 2020 whether the Mecoptera form a single clade, or whether the Siphonaptera (fleas) are inside that clade, so that the traditional "Mecoptera" is paraphyletic. However the earlier suggestion that the Siphonaptera are sister to the Boreidae is not supported. The two possible trees are shown below:

(a) Mecoptera is paraphyletic, Boriedae is sister to (Nannochoristidae + Siphonaptera):

(b) Mecoptera is monophyletic, Boreidae is sister to Pistillifera:

Genera 
This list is adapted from the World Checklist of extant Mecoptera species, and is complete as of 1997. The number of species in each genus is indicated in parentheses.
 Boreus (24) Latreille, 1816 (North America, Europe, Asia)
 Boreus hyemalis – also called the snow flea.
 Caurinus (2) Russell, 1979 (Oregon, Alaska)
 Hesperoboreus (2) Penny, 1977 (United States)

See also 
 Glacier flea
 Snow flies  genus Chionea – a convergent genus of wingless crane flies
 Apteropanorpidae – another family of wingless scorpionflies

References 

 
Mecoptera